The Charlotte Mint was the first United States branch mint. It was located in Charlotte, North Carolina and specialized in gold coinage.

History
Following the first documented discovery of gold in the United States, the country's first gold mine was established in North Carolina at the Reed Gold Mine. As no mints existed in the Charlotte area, miners had to send their gold dust to Philadelphia to be melted and coined. The transportation process was difficult, slow, expensive, and dangerous; frustration with this system led to the creation of private gold coining operations in the Charlotte area. However, making gold into local money had its own inherent problems, such as accurate weighing and determining fineness. In the spring of 1831, North Carolina merchants and miners petitioned Congress for a branch mint in the Charlotte region to reduce the risk of transporting gold. They received no response until three years later when the United States Treasury began to investigate private coining operations and recognized North Carolina's need for more federal coinage.

On March 3, 1835, the United States Congress approved an Act 115 to 60 to establish several branch mints; the act stated, "...one branch [to be established] at the town of Charlotte, in Mecklenburg County, in the state of North Carolina, for the coinage of gold only...And for the purpose of purchasing sites, erecting suitable buildings, and completing the necessary combinations of machinery...for the branch at Charlotte, fifty thousand dollars". This Act also authorized mints at Dahlonega, Georgia, and New Orleans, Louisiana, after President Andrew Jackson signed it into law.

Production

In November, 1835, Levi Woodbury, Secretary of the Treasury, was notified by Samuel MeComb that he had purchased from William Carson and F. L. Smith a full square containing 4 acres of land for $1,500.00, which is now the 400 block of West Trade Street.  Proposals for erection of the building were advertised and the contract was awarded to Perry & Ligon, of Raleigh, NC on October 15, 1835 at a price of $29,800.00.  In 1836, construction on the Charlotte Mint began.  It opened for business on July 27, 1837. Only raw gold was processed and refined until March 28, 1838, when the first $5 gold half eagle was struck in Charlotte. Later that year, $2½ quarter eagles were minted, and 1849 production started on a small gold dollar.  All gold coinage coming from this mint has a "C" mint mark to distinguish it from other sister mints then in operation. The Charlotte Mint issued over $5 million in gold coins over the course of nine years – 1849-55, 1857, and 1859. Coins produced in 1850, '52, '55, and '59 are considered rare or very rare.

War
In May 1861, North Carolina seceded from the Union. The Confederacy seized the Charlotte Mint along with those at New Orleans and Dahlonega.The Confederate government continued coining operations until October when it became clear it was a futile effort. The mint was then converted into a hospital and military office space for the remainder of the Civil War.

After the war
Federal troops used the offices for the first few years of Reconstruction.  In 1867, the U.S. government downgraded it to an assay office due to a shortage of gold dust. In 1873, the General Assembly of North Carolina petitioned Congress to reopen the mint at Charlotte.  This request was denied.

The Assay office operated until 1913. From 1917 to 1919, the Charlotte Women's Club met in the building.  It also served as a Red Cross station during World War I.

Museum

In 1931, the building was to be demolished to make room for the post office expansion next door. A coalition of private citizens acquired the structure from the U.S. Treasury Department in 1933.

They relocated the structure a few miles east of downtown Charlotte, to the historic neighborhood of Eastover on a plot of land donated by E.C. Griffith. In 1936, it was dedicated as the Mint Museum of Art, the first art museum in North Carolina. On display are thousands of items, along with a complete collection of all gold coins minted at the Charlotte Mint. The museum also includes a reference library with over 15,000 volumes and a theater featuring lectures and performances.

Charlotte Mint gold coins range from scarce to extremely rare. They are some of the most desired items in numismatics today.

Footnotes

Further reading 
 D. Winter, Charlotte Mint Gold Coins, Bowers and Merena Galleries, 1987. An illustrated catalog of all gold coins produced at the Charlotte Mint.
 R. W. Burdette, From Mine to Mint: American Coinage Operations and Technology, 1833 to 1937, Seneca Mills Press, March 20, 2013. Text detailing the technology, equipment, and operations of the United States Mints from 1833 to 1937.

See also

Historical United States mints
California gold coinage

External links

U.S. Mint

United States Mint
Mints of the United States
Mint
North Carolina in the American Civil War
Economy of Charlotte, North Carolina
Manufacturing plants in the United States
1835 establishments in North Carolina
1861 disestablishments in North Carolina